Peter II Nowak  was a 15th-century Bishop of Wrocław, Poland.

Peter, as provost of the cathedral succeeded Konrad IV the Older as Bishop of both Wrocław and the Ecclesiastical Duchy of Nysa.

As bishop Peter succeeded in restoring the diocesan finances and redeeming most of the church lands which his predecessor had mortgaged. He also sought, at the 1454AD synod to restore discipline within the diocese.

References 

Prince-Bishops of Breslau
15th-century Roman Catholic bishops in Poland
1456 deaths
Year of birth unknown